Boyneside is a rural locality in the South Burnett Region, Queensland, Australia.

History 
Boyneside Provisional School opened on 1927. It became Boynside State School in 1929. It closed on 1969.

Economy 
Coopers Gap Wind Farm is on Niagara Road.

References 

South Burnett Region
Localities in Queensland